Marko Milošević (born 7 February 1991) is a Serbian footballer who plays as a goalkeeper for Hungarian club Debrecen.

Club career
On 14 January 2022, Milošević signed for Astana on a contract until the end of 2023.

On 1 March 2023, Milošević joined Debrecen in Hungary.

References

External links
 
 Marko Milošević stats at utakmica.rs 
 

1991 births
Footballers from Belgrade
Living people
Association football goalkeepers
Serbian footballers
FK Zemun players
RFK Grafičar Beograd players
FK Radnički Nova Pazova players
FK Smederevo players
FK Sinđelić Beograd players
FK Voždovac players
FK Napredak Kruševac players
FC Caspiy players
FC Astana players
Debreceni VSC players
Kazakhstan Premier League players
Nemzeti Bajnokság I players
Serbian First League players
Serbian SuperLiga players
Serbian expatriate footballers
Expatriate footballers in Kazakhstan
Serbian expatriate sportspeople in Kazakhstan
Expatriate footballers in Hungary
Serbian expatriate sportspeople in Hungary